Merrily We Go to Hell is a 1932 pre-Code film directed by Dorothy Arzner, and starring Fredric March and Sylvia Sidney. The supporting cast features a prominent early appearance by Cary Grant, billed ninth in the cast but with a larger part than this would suggest. The picture's title is an example of the sensationalistic titles that were common in the pre-Code era. Many newspapers refused to publicize the film because of its racy title. The title is a line March's character says while making a toast. The supporting cast features a prominent early appearance by Cary Grant, billed ninth in the cast but with a larger part than this would suggest.

March plays a man undone by alcoholism and adultery. Sidney plays his wife who, when she discovers his adultery, begins an affair with another man. The film received a mixed review from The New York Times upon its release.

Plot
Jerry Corbett, a Chicago reporter and self-styled playwright, meets heiress Joan Prentice at a party and they begin dating. Jerry soon proposes to Joan, and even though his economic prospects are dim and he is an alcoholic, Joan accepts his marriage proposal, against the objections of her father. Even though Jerry becomes heavily intoxicated just before their engagement party, ruining it, Joan stands by him. Jerry writes some plays which are rejected, and fights his alcohol addiction. He manages to sell a play and the couple travels to New York to watch the production. The star of the play turns out to be Jerry's former girlfriend, Claire Hampstead, and on the premiere night he drinks heavily, becomes drunk, and mistakes Joan for Claire. Still, Joan stands by him. But, when Joan catches Jerry trying to sneak out to Claire's one night she kicks him out. The following day she tells him that they will have a "modern marriage" and that she intends to have affairs herself.

When Jerry is next seen, he is making a "Merrily we go to hell" toast with Claire. In turn, Joan and her date toast to the "holy state of matrimony–single lives, twin beds and triple bromides in the morning." Joan becomes pregnant and learns from her doctor that her health is poor. She tries to tell Jerry, but he is too occupied with Claire and she decides to move on. After he is unable to write a successful follow-up play, Jerry eventually realizes that he loves Joan, and regrets his behavior. He commits to sobriety, returns to Chicago, and works as a reporter again, but Joan's father keeps them apart. Jerry discovers Joan has given birth from a gossip columnist and goes to the hospital to see her. Joan's father tells him the baby died two hours after his birth, that Joan is very ill, and that she does not want to see him ever again. However, Jerry sneaks into her room anyway, while Joan in pain is asking the nurse to send for Jerry, she has to see him. He discovers his distraught wife has been pleading to see him all along. A repentant Jerry pledges his love to her and they kiss.

Cast
 Sylvia Sidney as Joan Prentice
 Fredric March as Jerry Corbett
 Adrianne Allen as Claire Hempstead
 Richard "Skeets" Gallagher as Buck
 George Irving as Mr. Prentice
 Esther Howard as Vi
 Florence Britton as Charlcie
 Charles Coleman as Richard Damery
 Cary Grant as Charlie Baxter
 Kent Taylor as Greg Boleslavsky
 Robert Greig as Baritone Bartender (uncredited)
 Theresa Harris as Bathroom Attendant at Nightclub (uncredited)

Reception
Mordaunt Hall, film critic for The New York Times, gave the film a mixed review upon its release. Hall believed the film was wildly funny in stretches, and described the acting by the two leads as "excellent", but believed the scenes in which March played intoxicated went nowhere, and that the script was lacking. However, despite similar reviews, which often noted that it had been directed by a woman, the film was one of the more financially successful films that year. Jessie Burns of Script criticised the casting of Fredric March in the film, finding him to be unconvincing, though thought that Adrianne Allen showed her "star" quality in her portrayal of an otherwise "artificial" character.

References

Bibliography

External links

Merrily We Go to Hell: Gingerbread, Cake, and Crème de Menthe an essay by Judith Mayne at the Criterion Collection

1932 films
1932 drama films
Adultery in films
American black-and-white films
American drama films
1930s English-language films
Films about alcoholism
Films directed by Dorothy Arzner
Paramount Pictures films
1930s American films